Égry is a commune in the Loiret department in north-central France.

History
The Château de La Mothe d'Égry was mentioned in 1360. Only some sections of wall and a stone bridge crossing its moat remain of the castle. Égry was a fief of the royal Duchy of Nemours.

See also
Communes of the Loiret department

References

Communes of Loiret